= Museum of Optical Illusions Trapani =

Museum of optical and perceptual illusions in Trapani, Sicily

- Museo delle Illusioni Ottiche di Trapani
- Location: Trapani, Sicily, Italy
- Coordinates: 38°00′59″N 12°30′47″E
- Website: https://www.mooitrapani.com/

The Museum of Optical Illusions Trapani (Italian: Museo delle Illusioni Ottiche di Trapani) is a museum in the historic centre of Trapani, Sicily, dedicated to optical, perceptual and spatial illusions.

== See also ==
- Optical illusion
- Science museum
- Trapani
